Barbara Ann Cochran (born January 4, 1951) is a former World Cup alpine ski racer and Olympic gold medalist from the United States.

Born in Claremont, New Hampshire, Cochran was the second of four siblings of the famous "Skiing Cochrans" family of Richmond, Vermont, which has operated a small ski area in their backyard since 1961.  Her father, Gordon "Mickey" Cochran, was a longtime coach, coaching youngsters of the Smuggler's Notch Ski Club, the University of Vermont Ski Team, and the U.S. Ski Team. The family has placed several generations of athletes on the U.S Ski Team: three-time national champion sister Marilyn, Barbara Ann, nine-time national champion brother Bob, and two-time national champion sister Lindy. The family's next generation includes niece Jessica Kelley, nephews Jimmy Cochran, Roger Brown, Tim Kelley, Robby Kelley, and son, Ryan Cochran-Siegle.

After retiring from competitions, Cochran graduated from college in Vermont, married Ron Williams, and published her book Skiing for Women. She eventually became a writer for The Washington Post.

Cochran now lives in her home in Starksboro, working hard on her own business, Golden Opportunities in Sports, Business, and Life, which teaches people how to handle the pressures of competition, work, academics, and any other obstacles that life throws at you. She is also working on a book that should soon be up and running. Cochran was inducted into the National Ski Hall of Fame in 1976, later joined by siblings Marilyn (1978) and Bob (2010). In 1979, the Supersisters trading card set was produced and distributed; one of the cards featured Cochran's name and picture. Cochran was also inducted into the then-recently established Vermont Sports Hall of Fame in 2013.

Career highlights

 Gold medal in slalom at the 1972 Winter Olympics in Sapporo, Japan
 won by 0.02 seconds, the smallest winning margin in Olympic history.
 Silver medal in slalom at the 1970 World Championships in Val Gardena, Italy
 Three World Cup victories, 18 podiums, 45 top tens 
 Two-time U.S. national champion.

World Cup results

Season standings

Points were only awarded for top ten finishes (see scoring system).

Race podiums
3 wins – (2 SL, 1 GS) 
18 podiums – (11 SL, 7 GS) 

World Championship results (Val Gardena, Italy) were included in the World Cup standings in 1970.

Olympic results

From 1948 through 1980, the Winter Olympics were also the World Championships for alpine skiing.

See also
Skiing Cochrans

References

External links

 U.S. Ski & Snowboard Hall of Fame – Barbara A. Cochran – inducted 1976 
Vermont Sports Hall of Fame – Barbara Ann Cochran – inducted 2013
University of Vermont Athletics Hall of Fame – Barbara Ann Cochran – skiing – inducted 1988

Olympic gold medalists for the United States in alpine skiing
Alpine skiers at the 1972 Winter Olympics
American female alpine skiers
University of Vermont alumni
Sportspeople from Vermont
People from Claremont, New Hampshire
1951 births
Living people
Medalists at the 1972 Winter Olympics
21st-century American women